This is a list of the members of the 9th Seanad Éireann, the upper house of the Oireachtas (legislature) of the Ireland.  These Senators were elected or appointed in 1957, after the 1957 general election and served until the close of poll for the 10th Seanad in 1961.

Composition of the 9th Seanad
There are a total of 60 seats in the Seanad. 43 Senators are elected by the Vocational panels, 6 elected by the Universities and 11 are nominated by the Taoiseach.

The following table shows the composition by party when the 9th Seanad first met on 22 May 1957.

List of senators

Changes

See also
Members of the 16th Dáil
Government of the 16th Dáil

References

External links

 
09